Mąkoszyn may refer to the following places:
Mąkoszyn, Greater Poland Voivodeship (west-central Poland)
Mąkoszyn, Kuyavian-Pomeranian Voivodeship (north-central Poland)
Mąkoszyn, Łódź Voivodeship (central Poland)

See also
Makoszyn